Survivor: Panama — Exile Island, also known as Survivor: Exile Island and Survivor: Panama, is the twelfth season of the American CBS competitive reality television series Survivor. The season was filmed in the Pearl Islands, off the coast of Panama from October 31, 2005 through December 8, 2005 and premiered on February 2, 2006. Hosted by Jeff Probst, it consisted of the usual 39 days of gameplay with 16 competitors, the first season with 16 competitors since Survivor: Pearl Islands five seasons prior. 

The season included a twist that originally came from Survivor: Palau called Exile Island. Each week at least one castaway is banished to an island away from all other contestants for the time period between the reward and immunity challenges. The castaway is given a single machete, a flint, a pot and a bucket of non-sanitized water. The island also contained a hidden immunity idol that could be used at tribal council after the votes have been cast. During the season finale on May 14, 2006, it was revealed that Aras Baskauskas was named the Sole Survivor over Danielle DiLorenzo in a 5-2 vote.

Contestants
The 16 players were initially split into four tribes by sex and age: young men (Viveros), older men (La Mina), young women (Bayoneta), and older women (Casaya). These four tribes were named after four islands located in the Pearl Islands. Shortly after the first Tribal Council, the Viveros and Bayoneta tribes were dissolved and a "schoolyard pick" formed two new integrated tribes using the Casaya and La Mina tribe names and camps. When there were ten contestants left, they merged into one tribe named Gitanos, the Spanish word for "gypsy." Coincidentally, a member from each of the original four tribes was represented in the final four.

Notable contestants from this season was former NASA astronaut Dan Barry and former Miss Texas Teen USA Misty Giles. Tina Scheer was originally slated for the previous season Survivor: Guatemala, but she backed out due to her son's death prior to that season.

Future appearances
Cirie Fields was selected from this season to compete in Survivor: Micronesia. She competed again in Survivor: Heroes vs. Villains as part of the Heroes tribe, and would return for a fourth time on Survivor: Game Changers. Danielle DiLorenzo also competed on Heroes vs. Villains as part of the Villains tribe. Aras Baskauskas returned for Survivor: Blood vs. Water, alongside his brother, Vytas. Terry Deitz and Shane Powers were included on the public poll to choose the cast of Survivor: Cambodia; Deitz was chosen to compete.

Outside of Survivor, Dan Barry competed on the seventh season of BattleBots in 2016. Fields competed in the USA Network reality competition series Snake in the Grass. Fields also competed on the Peacock reality TV series The Traitors.

Season summary
The game began with the 16 competitors split into four tribes by both relative age and gender. They were introduced to the concept of "Exile Island" with the promise of a hidden immunity idol located somewhere on it, while one person from the losing tribe at challenges would be sent to the island and given clues to look for it.  After the first four days, the four tribes were merged by schoolyard pick with mixed genders into two tribes, Casaya and La Mina. Casaya generally proved the stronger tribe, and opted to send Terry from La Mina over to Exile Island multiple times, which gave him the opportunity to discover the hidden immunity idol.

Going into the merge, Casaya was up 6 members to 4. While Terry won several individual immunities, he did not use it or the hidden immunity idol to save his former La Mina tribe members, leaving him as the sole remaining La Mina member and a perceived immunity challenge threat by the other Casaya tribe. Bruce was evacuated due a medical emergency, leaving six players at the game. At this juncture, Cirie, who saw both Terry and Shane looking separately to take Courtney, a weaker player, into the final Tribal Council as an assurance to win the jury's favor, convinced Aras and Danielle to blindside the other three, and succeeded in achieving Courtney's elimination, followed by Shane's. The final four vote came down a fire-making tiebreaker between Cirie and Danielle; Danielle ultimately won. Danielle won the final immunity challenge and opted to take Aras to the final Tribal Council, eliminating Terry. The final jury saw both Aras and Danielle as capable players but ultimately voted Aras as the Sole Survivor, five votes to two.

In the case of multiple tribes or castaways who win reward or immunity, they are listed in order of finish, or alphabetically where it was a team effort; where one castaway won and invited others, the invitees are in brackets.

Episodes

Voting history

Reception
Survivor: Panama has received mixed to positive reviews from fans and critics. The personalities of the Casaya tribe members, in particular fan-favorite Cirie Fields, were praised. However, aside from Terry Deitz, the members of the La Mina tribe was criticized for being perceived as less entertaining compared to their Casaya counterparts. As such, critics believe that the season is uneven due to the contrast in entertainment between the members of the two main tribes. Dalton Ross of Entertainment Weekly ranked this season 27th out of 40 criticizing the season's final immunity challenge for being unfair to Terry Deitz which lead to an "unmemorable" final two. The gameplay of winner Aras Baskauskas received mixed to negative reception. Baskauskas placed 23rd out of the first 34 winners in a fan poll conducted by Entertainment Weekly in 2017 and also received the fewest first-place votes out of every winner in the poll. In 2014, Joe Reid of The Wire ranked this season 8th out of 27. In 2015, a poll by Rob Has a Podcast ranked this season 12th out of 30 with Rob Cesternino ranking this season 14th. This was updated in 2021 during Cesternino's podcast, Survivor All-Time Top 40 Rankings, ranking 15th out of 40. In 2020, The "Purple Rock Podcast" ranked this season 10th out of 40 saying the "casting here is good" and the "gameplay is almost more interesting for what doesn’t happen than what does". Later that same year, Inside Survivor ranked this season 12th out of 40 saying it is a GREAT season that "features some of the best characters of all-time, has innovative gameplay, superb blindsides, an underdog story, and is perhaps the funniest season ever."

References

External links
 Official CBS Survivor Panama Website

2006 American television seasons
2005 in Panama
12
Television shows filmed in Panama